Felipe Augusto may refer to:

 Felipe Augusto (footballer, born 1992), Brazilian football player, full name Felipe Augusto Ferreira Batista
 Felipe Augusto (footballer, born 1993), Brazilian football player, full name Felipe Augusto de Abreu
 Felipe Augusto (footballer, born 2004), Brazilian football player, full name Felipe Augusto da Silva